Tzav, Tsav, Zav, Sav, or Ṣaw ( — Hebrew for "command," the sixth word, and the first distinctive word, in the parashah) is the 25th weekly Torah portion (parashah) in the annual Jewish cycle of Torah reading and the second in the Book of Leviticus. The parashah teaches how the priests performed the sacrifices and describes the ordination of Aaron and his sons. The parashah constitutes . The parashah is made up of 5,096 Hebrew letters, 1,353 Hebrew words, 97 verses, and 170 lines in a Torah scroll (Sefer Torah). Jews read it the 24th or 25th Sabbath after Simchat Torah, generally in the second half of March or the first half of April.

Readings

First reading — Leviticus 6:1–11

In the first reading (aliyah), God told Moses to command Aaron and the priests about the rituals of the sacrifices (karbanot).

In verse 6:2 "...it is that which goeth up on its firewood upon the altar all night unto the morning," the letter  in the word  is small.

The burnt offering (olah) was to burn on the altar until morning, when the priest was to clear the ashes to a place outside the camp. The priests were to keep the fire burning, every morning feeding it wood.

The meal offering (minchah) was to be presented before the altar, a handful of it burned on the altar, and the balance eaten by the priests as unleavened cakes in the Tent of Meeting.

Second reading — Leviticus 6:12–7:10
In the second reading (aliyah), on the occasion of the High Priest's anointment, the meal offering was to be prepared with oil on a griddle and then entirely burned on the altar.

The sin offering (chatat) was to be slaughtered at the same place as the burnt offering, and the priest who offered it was to eat it in the Tent of Meeting. If the sin offering was cooked in an earthen vessel, that vessel was to be broken afterward. A copper vessel could be rinsed with water and reused. If blood of the sin offering was brought into the Tent of Meeting for expiation, the entire offering was to be burned on the altar.

The guilt offering (asham) was to be slaughtered at the same place as the burnt offering, the priest was to dash its blood on the altar, burn its fat, broad tail, kidneys, and protuberance on the liver on the altar, and the priest who offered it was to eat the balance of its meat in the Tent of Meeting.

The priest who offered a burnt offering kept the skin. The priest who offered it was to eat any baked or grilled meal offering, but every other meal offering was to be shared among all the priests.

Third reading — Leviticus 7:11–38
In the third reading (aliyah), the peace offering (shelamim), if offered for thanksgiving, was to be offered with unleavened cakes or wafers with oil, which would go to the priest who dashed the blood of the peace offering. All the meat of the peace offering had to be eaten on the day that it was offered. If offered as a votive or a freewill offering, it could be eaten for two days, and what was then left on the third day was to be burned.

Meat that touched anything unclean could not be eaten; it had to be burned. And only a person who was unclean could not eat meat from peace offerings, at pain of exile. One could eat no fat or blood, at pain of exile.

The person offering the peace offering had to present the offering and its fat himself, the priest would burn the fat on the altar, the breast would go to the priests, and the right thigh would go to the priest who offered the sacrifice.

Fourth reading — Leviticus 8:1–13
In the fourth reading (aliyah), God instructed Moses to assemble the whole community at the entrance of the Tent of Meeting for the priests' ordination. Moses brought Aaron and his sons forward, washed them, and dressed Aaron in his vestments. Moses anointed and consecrated the Tabernacle and all that was in it, and then anointed and consecrated Aaron and his sons.

Fifth reading — Leviticus 8:14–21
In the fifth reading (aliyah), Moses led forward a bull for a sin offering, Aaron and his sons laid their hands on the bull's head, and it was slaughtered. Moses put the bull's blood on the horns and the base of the altar, burned the fat, the protuberance of the liver, and the kidneys on the altar, and burned the rest of the bull outside the camp. Moses then brought forward a ram for a burnt offering, Aaron and his sons laid their hands on the ram's head, and it was slaughtered. Moses dashed the blood against the altar and burned all of the ram on the altar.

Sixth reading — Leviticus 8:22–29
In the sixth reading (aliyah), Moses then brought forward a second ram for ordination, Aaron and his sons laid their hands on the ram's head, and it was slaughtered. Moses put some of its blood on Aaron and his sons, on the ridges of their right ears, on the thumbs of their right hands, and on the big toes of their right feet. Moses then burned the animal's fat, broad tail, protuberance of the liver, kidneys, and right thigh on the altar with a cake of unleavened bread, a cake of oil bread, and a wafer as an ordination offering. Moses raised the breast before God and then took it as his portion.

Seventh reading — Leviticus 8:30–36
In the seventh reading (aliyah), Moses sprinkled oil and blood on Aaron and his sons and their vestments. And Moses told Aaron and his sons to boil the meat at the entrance of the Tent of Meeting and eat it there, and remain at the Tent of Meeting for seven days to complete their ordination, and they did all the things that God had commanded through Moses.

Readings according to the triennial cycle
Jews who read the Torah according to the triennial cycle of Torah reading read the parashah according to the following schedule:

In inner-Biblical interpretation

This parashah and the preceding one (Vayikra) have parallels or are discussed in these Biblical sources:

Leviticus chapters 1–7
In Psalm  God clarifies the purpose of sacrifices. God states that correct sacrifice was not the taking of a bull out of the sacrificer's house, nor the taking of a goat out of the sacrificer's fold, to convey to God, for every animal was already God's possession. The sacrificer was not to think of the sacrifice as food for God, for God neither hungers nor eats. Rather, the worshiper was to offer to God the sacrifice of thanksgiving and call upon God in times of trouble, and thus God would deliver the worshiper and the worshiper would honor God.

The Hebrew Bible reports several instances of sacrifices before God explicitly called for them in  While  and  set out the procedure for the burnt offering (olah), before then,  reports that Noah offered burnt-offerings (olot) of every clean beast and bird on an altar after the waters of the Flood subsided. The story of the Binding of Isaac includes three references to the burnt offering (olah). In  God told Abraham to take Isaac and offer him as a burnt-offering (olah).  then reports that Abraham rose early in the morning and split the wood for the burnt-offering (olah). And after the angel of the Lord averted Isaac's sacrifice,  reports that Abraham lifted up his eyes and saw a ram caught in a thicket, and Abraham then offered the ram as a burnt-offering (olah) instead of his son.  reports that Moses pressed Pharaoh for Pharaoh to give the Israelites "sacrifices and burnt-offerings" (zevachim v'olot) to offer to God. And  reports that after Jethro heard all that God did to Pharaoh and the Egyptians, Jethro offered a burnt-offering and sacrifices (olah uzevachim) to God.

While  and  set out the procedure for the meal-offering (minchah), before then, in  Cain brought an offering (minchah) of the fruit of the ground. And then  reports that God had respect for Abel and his offering (minchato), but for Cain and his offering (minchato), God had no respect.

And while  indicates that one bringing an animal sacrifice needed also to bring a drink-offering (nesech), before then, in  Jacob poured out a drink-offering (nesech) at Bethel.

More generally, the Hebrew Bible addressed "sacrifices" (zevachim) generically in connection with Jacob and Moses. After Jacob and Laban reconciled,  reports that Jacob offered a sacrifice (zevach) on the mountain and shared a meal with his kinsmen. And after Jacob learned that Joseph was still alive in Egypt,  reports that Jacob journeyed to Beersheba and offered sacrifices (zevachim) to the God of his father Isaac. And Moses and Aaron argued repeatedly with Pharaoh over their request to go three days' journey into the wilderness and sacrifice (venizbechah) to God.

The Hebrew Bible also includes several ambiguous reports in which Abraham or Isaac built or returned to an altar and "called upon the name of the Lord." In these cases, the text implies but does not explicitly state that the Patriarch offered a sacrifice. And at God's request, Abraham conducted an unusual sacrifice at the Covenant between the Pieces in

Leviticus chapter 8
This is the pattern of instruction and construction of the Tabernacle and its furnishings:

The Torah mentions the combination of ear, thumb, and toe in three places. In  God instructed Moses how to initiate the priests, telling him to kill a ram, take some of its blood, and put it on the tip of the right ear of Aaron and his sons, on the thumb of their right hand, and on the great toe of their right foot, and dash the remaining blood against the altar round about. And then  reports that Moses followed God's instructions to initiate Aaron and his sons. Then,  17, 25, and 28 set forth a similar procedure for the cleansing of a person with skin disease (tzara'at). In  God instructed the priest on the day of the person's cleansing to take some of the blood of a guilt-offering and put it upon the tip of the right ear, the thumb of the right hand, and the great toe of the right foot of the one to be cleansed. And then in  God instructed the priest to put oil on the tip of the right ear, the thumb of the right hand, and the great toe of the right foot of the one to be cleansed, on top of the blood of the guilt-offering.

In early nonrabbinic interpretation

The parashah has parallels or is discussed in these early nonrabbinic sources:

Leviticus chapter 8
Reading  Philo noted that Moses took some blood from the sacrificed ram, holding a vial under it to catch it, and with it he anointed three parts of the body of the initiated priests — the tip of the ear, the extremity of the hand, and the extremity of the foot, all on the right side. Philo taught that this signified that the perfect person must be pure in every word and action, and in all of life. For it is the hearing that judges a person's words, the hand is the symbol of action, and the foot of the way in which a person walks in life. Philo taught that since each of these parts is an extremity of the body, and on the right side, this indicates that improvement in everything is to be arrived at by dexterity, being a portion of felicity, and being the true aim in life, which a person must necessarily labor to attain, and to which a person ought to refer all actions, aiming at them in life as an archer aims at a target.

In classical rabbinic interpretation
The parashah is discussed in these rabbinic sources from the era of the Mishnah and the Talmud:

Leviticus chapter 6
Tractate Zevachim in the Mishnah, Tosefta, and Babylonian Talmud interpreted the law of animal sacrifices in  The Mishnah taught that a sacrifice was slaughtered for the sake of six things: (1) for the sake of the sacrifice for which it was consecrated, (2) for the sake of the offerer, (3) for the sake of the Divine Name, (4) for the sake of the altar fires, (5) for the sake of an aroma, and (6) for the sake of pleasing God, and a sin-offering and a guilt-offering for the sake of sin. Rabbi Jose taught that even if the offerer did not have any of these purposes at heart, the offering was valid, because it was a regulation of the court, since the intention was determined only by the priest who performed the service. The Mishnah taught that the intention of the priest conducting the sacrifice determined whether the offering would prove valid.

Rabbi Simeon taught that, generally speaking, the Torah required a burnt offering only as expiation for sinful meditation of the heart.

A Midrash taught that if people repent, it is accounted as if they had gone up to Jerusalem, built the Temple and the altars, and offered all the sacrifices ordained in the Torah. Rabbi Aha said in the name of Rabbi Hanina ben Pappa that God accounts studying the sacrifices as equivalent to offering them. Rav Huna taught that God said that engaging in the study of Mishnah is as if one were offering up sacrifices. Samuel taught that God said that engaging in the study of the law is as if one were building the Temple. And the Avot of Rabbi Natan taught that God loves Torah study more than sacrifice.

Rabbi Ammi taught that Abraham asked God if Israel would come to sin, would God punish them as God punished the generation of the Flood and the generation of the Tower of Babel. God answered that God would not. Abraham then asked God in  “How shall I know?” God replied in  “Take Me a heifer of three years old . . .” (indicating that Israel would obtain forgiveness through sacrifices). Abraham then asked God what Israel would do when the Temple would no longer exist. God replied that whenever Jews read the Biblical text dealing with sacrifices, God would reckon it as if they were bringing an offering, and forgive all their iniquities.

Rav Sheshet continued that he had fasted and his fat and blood had diminished, so he asked that it be God's will to account Rav Sheshet fat and blood that had been diminished as if he had offered them on the Altar.

Rabbi Isaac declared that prayer is greater than sacrifice.

The Avot of Rabbi Natan taught that as Rabban Johanan ben Zakai and Rabbi Joshua were leaving Jerusalem, Rabbi Joshua expressed sorrow that the place where the Israelites had atoned for their iniquities had been destroyed. But Rabban Johanan ben Zakai told him not to grieve, for we have in acts of loving-kindness another atonement as effective as sacrifice at the Temple, as  says, “For I desire mercy, and not sacrifice.”

Rabbi Mani of Sheab and Rabbi Joshua of Siknin in the name of Rabbi Levi explained the origin of  Moses prayed on Aaron's behalf, noting that the beginning of Leviticus repeatedly referred to Aaron's sons, barely mentioning Aaron himself. Moses asked whether God could love well water but hate the well. Moses noted that God honored the olive tree and the vine for the sake of their offspring, teaching that the priests could use all trees' wood for the altar fire except that of the olive and vine. Moses thus asked God whether God might honor Aaron for the sake of his sons, and God replied that God would reinstate Aaron and honor him above his sons. And thus God said to Moses the words of  "Command Aaron and his sons."

Rabbi Abin deduced from  that burnt offerings were wholly given over to the flames.

The School of Rabbi Ishmael taught that whenever Scripture uses the word "command" (tzav) (as  does), it denotes exhortation to obedience immediately and for all time.

Rabbi Joshua of Siknin said in Rabbi Levi's name that the wording of  supports the argument of Rabbi Jose bar Hanina (on which he differed with Rabbi Eleazar) that the descendants of Noah offered only burnt-offerings (and not peace-offerings, as before the Revelation at Mount Sinai, people were unworthy to consume any part of an animal consecrated to God). Rabbi Joshua of Siknin noted that  says, "This is the law of the burnt-offering: that is the burnt-offering," which Rabbi Joshua of Siknin read to mean "that is the burnt-offering" that the Noahides used to offer. But when  addresses peace-offerings, it says, "And this is the law of the sacrifice of peace-offerings," and does not say, "that they offered" (which would indicate that they offered it in the past, before Revelation). Rabbi Joshua of Siknin thus read  to teach that they would offer the peace-offering only after the events of 

Reading the words of  "This is the law of the burnt-offering: it is that which goes up on its firewood upon the altar all night to the morning," the Mishnah concluded that the altar sanctified whatever was eligible for it. Rabbi Joshua taught that whatever was eligible for the altar fire did not descend once it had ascended. Thus, just as the burnt-offering, which was eligible for the altar fire, did not descend once it had ascended, so whatever was eligible for the altar fire did not descend once it ascended.

The Gemara interpreted the words in  "This is the law of the burnt-offering: It is that which goes up on its firewood upon the altar all night into the morning." From the passage, "which goes up on its firewood upon the altar all night," the Rabbis deduced that once a thing had been placed upon the altar, it could not be taken down all night. According to Rabbi Judah, they exclude (1) an animal slaughtered at night, (2) an animal whose blood was spilled, and (3) an animal whose blood was carried out beyond the curtains. Rabbi Judah taught that if any of these things had been placed on the altar, it was brought down. Rabbi Simeon noted that  says "burnt-offering." From this, Rabbi Simeon taught that one can only know that a fit burnt-offering remained on the altar. But Rabbi Simeon taught that the phrase "the law of the burnt-offering" intimates one law for all burnt-offerings, namely, that if they were placed on the altar, they were not removed. Rabbi Simeon taught that this law applied to animals that were slaughtered at night, or whose blood was spilt, or whose blood passed out of the curtains, or whose flesh spent the night away from the altar, or whose flesh went out, or were unclean, or were slaughtered with the intention of burning its flesh after time or out of bounds, or whose blood was received and sprinkled by unfit priests, or whose blood was applied below the scarlet line when it should have been applied above, or whose blood was applied above when it should have been applied below, or whose blood was applied outside when it should have been applied within, or whose blood was applied within when it should have been applied outside, or a Passover-offering or a sin-offering that one slaughtered for a different purpose. Rabbi Simeon suggested that one might think that law would also include an animal used for bestiality, set aside for an idolatrous sacrifice or worshipped, a harlot's hire or the price of a dog (as referred to in ), or a mixed breed, or a trefah (a torn or otherwise disqualified animal), or an animal calved through a cesarean section. But Rabbi Simeon taught that the word "This" serves to exclude these. Rabbi Simeon explained that he included the former in the general rule because their disqualification arose in the sanctuary, while he excluded the latter because their disqualification did not arise in the sanctuary.

The Gemara taught that it is from the words of  "upon the altar all night into the morning," that the Mishnah concludes that "the whole of the night is proper time for ... burning fat and limbs (on the altar)." And the Mishnah then set forth as a general rule: "Any commandment which is to be performed by night may be performed during the whole of the night."

The Rabbis taught a story reflecting the importance of the regular offering required by  When the Hasmonean brothers Hyrcanus and Aristobulus were contending with one another, and one was within Jerusalem's city wall and the other was outside, those within would let down a basket of money to their besiegers every day, and in return the besiegers would send up kosher animals for the regular sacrifices. But an old man among the besiegers argued that as long as those within were allowed to continue to perform sacrifices, they could not be defeated. So on the next day, when those inside sent down the basket of money, the besiegers sent up a pig. When the pig reached the center of the wall, it stuck its hooves into the wall, and an earthquake shook the entire Land of Israel. On that occasion, the Rabbis proclaimed a curse on those who bred pigs.

It was taught in the name of Rabbi Nehemiah that in obedience to  the Israelites kept the fire burning in the altar for about 116 years, yet the wood of the altar did not burn, and the brass of the altar did not melt, even though it was taught in the name of Rabbi Hoshaiah that the metal was only as thick as a coin.

Rabbi Levi read  homiletically to mean: "This is the law regarding a person striving to be high: It is that it goes up on its burning-place." Thus Rabbi Levi read the verse to teach that a person who behaves boastfully should be punished by fire.

A Midrash deduced the importance of peace from the way that the listing of the individual sacrifices in  concludes with the peace offering.  gives "the law of the burnt-offering,"  gives "the law of the meal-offering,"  gives "the law of the sin-offering,"  gives "the law of the guilt-offering," and  gives "the law of the sacrifice of peace-offerings."

Rabbi Judah the Levite, the son of Rabbi Shalom, taught that God's arrangements are not like those of mortals. For example, the cook of a human master dons fair apparel when going out, but puts on ragged things and an apron when working in the kitchen. Moreover, when sweeping the stove or oven, the cook puts on even worse clothing. But in God's presence, when the priest swept the altar and removed the ashes from it, he donned fine garments, as  says: "And the priest shall put on his linen garment," so that "he shall take up the ashes." This is to teach that pride has no place with the Omnipresent.

The priest who won the right to clear the ashes would prepare to do so. They warned him to take care not to touch any vessel until he had washed his hands and feet. No one entered with him. He did not carry any light, but proceeded by the light of the altar fire. No one saw him or heard a sound from him until they heard the noise of the wooden wheel that Ben Katin made for the laver. When they told him that the time had come, he washed his hands and feet with water from the laver, took the silver fire-pan, went to the top of the altar, cleared away the cinders on either side, and scooped up the ashes in the center. He then came down, and when he reached the floor, he turned to the north (toward the altar) and went along the east side of the ramp for about ten cubits, and he then piled the cinders on the pavement three handbreadths away from the ramp, in the place where they used to put the crop of the birds, the ashes from the inner altar, and the ash from the menorah.

Rabbi Johanan called his garments "my honor." Rabbi Aha bar Abba said in Rabbi Johanan's name that  "And he shall put off his garments, and put on other garments," teaches that a change of garments is an act of honor in the Torah. And the School of Rabbi Ishmael taught that the Torah teaches us manners: In the garments in which one cooked a dish for one's master, one should not pour a cup of wine for one's master. Rabbi Hiyya bar Abba said in Rabbi Johanan's name that it is a disgrace for a scholar to go out into the marketplace with patched shoes. The Gemara objected that Rabbi Aha bar Hanina went out that way; Rabbi Aha son of Rav Nachman clarified that the prohibition is of patches upon patches. Rabbi Hiyya bar Abba also said in Rabbi Johanan's name that any scholar who has a grease stain on a garment is worthy of death, for Wisdom says in  "All they that hate me (mesanne'ai) love (merit) death," and we should read not , mesanne'ai, but , masni'ai (that make me hated, that is, despised). Thus a scholar who has no pride in personal appearance brings contempt upon learning. Ravina taught that this was stated about a thick patch (or others say, a bloodstain). The Gemara harmonized the two opinions by teaching that one referred to an outer garment, the other to an undergarment. Rabbi Hiyya bar Abba also said in Rabbi Johanan's name that in  "As my servant Isaiah walked naked and barefoot," "naked" means in worn-out garments, and "barefoot" means in patched shoes.

Tractate Menachot in the Mishnah, Tosefta, and Babylonian Talmud interpreted the law of meal offerings in 

The Rabbis taught that through the word "this," Aaron became degraded, as it is said in  "And Aaron said: ‘. . . I cast it into the fire, and there came out this calf,'" and through the word "this," Aaron was also elevated, as it is said in  "This is the offering of Aaron and of his sons, which they shall offer to the Lord on the day when he is anointed" to become High Priest.

A Midrash noted that the commandment of  that Aaron offer sacrifices paralleled Samson's riddle "out of the eater came forth food", for Aaron was to eat the sacrifices, and by virtue of  a sacrifice was to come from him.

Leviticus chapter 7
A Midrash read the words of  “Whoso offers the sacrifice of thanksgiving honors Me,” to teach that the thanksgiving offerings of  honored God more than sin offerings or guilt offerings. Rabbi Huna said in the name of Rabbi Aha that  taught that one who gave a thanksgiving offering gave God honor upon honor. Rabbi Berekiah said in the name of Rabbi Abba bar Kahana that the donor honored God in this world and will honor God in the World to Come. And the continuation of  “to him who sets right the way,” referred to those who clear stones from roads. Alternatively, the Midrash taught that it refers to teachers of Scripture and the Oral Law who instruct the young with sincerity. Alternatively, Rabbi Jose the son of Rabbi Judah said in the name of Rabbi Menahem the son of Rabbi Jose that it refers to shopkeepers who sell produce that has already been tithed. Alternatively, the Midrash taught that it refers to people who light lamps to provide light for the public.

From his tenants and entourage, the king merely collected their tribute. But when another who was neither a tenant nor a member of the king's entourage came to offer him homage, the king offered him a seat. Thus Rabbi Phinehas read  homiletically to mean: "If it be for a thanks giving, He [God] will bring him [the offerer] near [to God]." Rabbi Phinehas and Rabbi Levi and Rabbi Johanan said in the name of Rabbi Menahem of Gallia that in the Time to Come, all sacrifices will be annulled, but the thanksgiving sacrifice of  will not be annulled, and all prayers will be annulled, but the Thanksgiving (Modim) prayer will not be annulled.

And a freewill-offering was when one said, "This animal shall serve as a burnt-offering" (specifying a particular animal). In the case of vow offerings, one was responsible for replacement of the animal if the animal died or was stolen; but in the case of freewill obligations, one was not held responsible for the animal's replacement if the specified animal died or was stolen.

Rabbi Eliezer taught that the prohibition of eating the meat of a peace-offering on the third day in  also applied to invalidate the sacrifice of one who merely intended to eat sacrificial meat on the third day.

The Sages taught that one may trust butchers to remove chelev, the fat that  and  forbids.

Rabbi Berekiah said in the name of Rabbi Isaac that in the Time to Come, God will make a banquet for God's righteous servants, and whoever had not eaten meat from an animal that died other than through ritual slaughtering (neveilah, prohibited by ) in this world will have the privilege of enjoying it in the World to Come. (By one's present self-restraint one might merit to partake of the banquet in the Hereafter.) For this reason Moses admonished the Israelites in  "This is the animal that you shall eat."

A Baraita explained how the priests performed the waiving. A priest placed the sacrificial portions on the palm of his hand, the breast and thigh on top of the sacrificial portions, and whenever there was a bread offering, the bread on top of the breast and thigh. And the Gemara noted that  implies that the breast and thigh were on top of the offerings of fat. But the Gemara noted that  says that the priest "shall bring the fat upon the breast." Abaye reconciled the verses by explaining that  refers to the way that the priest brought the parts from the slaughtering place. The priest then turned them over and placed them into the hands of a second priest, who waived them. Noting further that  says that "they put the fat upon the breasts," the Gemara deduced that this second priest then handed the parts over to a third priest, who burned them. The Gemara thus concluded that these verses taught that three priests were required for this part of the service, giving effect to the teaching of  "In the multitude of people is the king's glory."

Upon seeing the scene, one citizen expressed his fear of the ruler. A second citizen answered that as long as their conduct was good, they had no reason to fear. Similarly, when the Israelites heard the section of the Torah dealing with sacrifices, they became afraid. But Moses told them not to be afraid; if they occupied themselves with the Torah, they would have no reason to fear.

A Midrash asked why  mentions peace-offerings last in its list of sacrifices, and suggested that it was because there are many kinds of peace-offerings. Rabbi Simon said that assorted desserts always come last, because they consist of many kinds of things.

Noting that  says that "This is the law . . . that the Lord commanded Moses in mount Sinai," Rabbi Judah ben Bathyra counted  among 13 limiting phrases recorded in the Torah to inform us that God spoke not to Aaron but to Moses with instruction that he should tell Aaron. Rabbi Judah ben Bathyra taught that these 13 limiting phrases correspond to and limit 13 Divine communications recorded in the Torah as having been made to both Moses and Aaron.

Leviticus chapter 8
Rabbi Samuel bar Nahman taught that Moses first incurred his fate to die in the wilderness from his conduct at the Burning Bush, for there God tried for seven days to persuade Moses to go on his errand to Egypt, as  says, “And Moses said to the Lord: ‘Oh Lord, I am not a man of words, neither yesterday, nor the day before, nor since you have spoken to your servant’” (which the Midrash interpreted to indicate seven days of conversation). And in the end, Moses told God in  “Send, I pray, by the hand of him whom You will send.” God replied that God would keep this in store for Moses. Rabbi Berekiah in Rabbi Levi's name and Rabbi Helbo give different answers on when God repaid Moses. One said that all the seven days of the consecration of the priesthood in  Moses functioned as High Priest, and he came to think that the office belonged to him. But in the end, God told Moses that the job was not his, but his brother's, as  says, “And it came to pass on the eighth day, that Moses called Aaron.” The other taught that all the first seven days of Adar of the fortieth year, Moses beseeched God to enter the Promised Land, but in the end, God told him in  “You shall not go over this Jordan.”

Rabbi Jose noted that even though  reported that the Tabernacle's courtyard was just 100 cubits by 50 cubits (about 150 feet by 75 feet), a little space held a lot, as  implied that the space miraculously held the entire Israelite people.

The Tosefta deduced from the congregation's placement in  that in a synagogue, as well, the people face toward the sanctuary.

The Mishnah taught that the High Priest inquired of the Urim and Thummim noted in  only for the king, for the court, or for one whom the community needed.

The term "Thummim" is like the Hebrew word tam meaning "to be complete," and thus it was called "Thummim" because its predictions were fulfilled. The Gemara discussed how they used the Urim and Thummim: Rabbi Johanan said that the letters of the stones in the breastplate stood out to spell out the answer. Resh Lakish said that the letters joined each other to spell words. But the Gemara noted that the Hebrew letter , tsade, was missing from the list of the 12 tribes of Israel. Rabbi Samuel bar Isaac said that the stones of the breastplate also contained the names of Abraham, Isaac and Jacob. But the Gemara noted that the Hebrew letter , teth, was also missing. Rav Aha bar Jacob said that they also contained the words: "The tribes of Jeshurun." The Gemara taught that although the decree of a prophet could be revoked, the decree of the Urim and Thummim could not be revoked, as  says, "By the judgment of the Urim."

The Pirke De-Rabbi Eliezer taught that when Israel sinned in the matter of the devoted things, as reported in  Joshua looked at the 12 stones corresponding to the 12 tribes that were upon the High Priest's breastplate. For every tribe that had sinned, the light of its stone became dim, and Joshua saw that the light of the stone for the tribe of Judah had become dim. So Joshua knew that the tribe of Judah had transgressed in the matter of the devoted things. Similarly, the Pirke De-Rabbi Eliezer taught that Saul saw the Philistines turning against Israel, and he knew that Israel had sinned in the matter of the ban. Saul looked at the 12 stones, and for each tribe that had followed the law, its stone (on the High Priest's breastplate) shined with its light, and for each tribe that had transgressed, the light of its stone was dim. So Saul knew that the tribe of Benjamin had trespassed in the matter of the ban.

The Mishnah reported that with the death of the former prophets, the Urim and Thummim ceased. In this connection, the Gemara reported differing views of who the former prophets were. Rav Huna said they were David, Samuel, and Solomon. Rav Nachman said that during the days of David, they were sometimes successful and sometimes not (getting an answer from the Urim and Thummim), for Zadok consulted it and succeeded, while Abiathar consulted it and was not successful, as  reports, "And Abiathar went up." (He retired from the priesthood because the Urim and Thummim gave him no reply.) Rabbah bar Samuel asked whether the report of 2 Chronicles  "And he (King Uzziah of Judah) set himself to seek God all the days of Zechariah, who had understanding in the vision of God," did not refer to the Urim and Thummim. But the Gemara answered that Uzziah did so through Zechariah's prophecy. A Baraita told that when the first Temple was destroyed, the Urim and Thummim ceased, and explained  (reporting events after the Jews returned from the Babylonian Captivity), "And the governor said to them that they should not eat of the most holy things till there stood up a priest with Urim and Thummim," as a reference to the remote future, as when one speaks of the time of the Messiah. Rav Nachman concluded that the term "former prophets" referred to a period before Haggai, Zechariah, and Malachi, who were latter prophets. And the Jerusalem Talmud taught that the "former prophets" referred to Samuel and David, and thus the Urim and Thummim did not function in the period of the First Temple, either.

The Gemara taught that the early scholars were called soferim (related to the original sense of its root safar, "to count") because they used to count all the letters of the Torah (to ensure the correctness of the text). (And in a Torah Scroll, scribes write that vav larger than the surrounding letters.) They used to say the words , darosh darash ("diligently inquired"), in  mark the half-way point of the words in the Torah. And they used to say  marks the half-way point of the verses in the Torah. (Rav Joseph presumed that the Torah contains an even number of letters.) The scholars replied that they could bring a Torah Scroll and count, for Rabbah bar bar Hanah said on a similar occasion that they did not stir from where they were until a Torah Scroll was brought and they counted. Rav Joseph replied that they (in Rabbah bar bar Hanah's time) were thoroughly versed in the proper defective and full spellings of words (that could be spelled in variant ways), but they (in Rav Joseph's time) were not. Similarly, Rav Joseph asked whether  belongs to the first half or the second half of verses. Abaye replied that for verses, at least, we can bring a Scroll and count them. But Rav Joseph replied that even with verses, they could no longer be certain. For when Rav Aha bar Adda came (from the Land of Israel to Babylon), he said that in the West (in the Land of Israel), they divided  into three verses. Nonetheless, the Rabbis taught in a Baraita that there are 5,888 verses in the Torah.

The Sifra taught that the words "and put it upon the tip of Aaron's right ear" in  refer to the middle ridge of the ear. And the Sifra taught that the words "and upon the thumb of his right hand" in  refer to the middle knuckle.

Rabbi Jacob bar Acha taught in the name of Rabbi Zorah that the command to Aaron in  "at the door of the tent of meeting shall you abide day and night seven days, and keep the charge of the Lord," served as a source for the law of seven days of mourning for the death of a relative (shivah). Rabbi Jacob bar Acha interpreted Moses to tell Aaron that just as God observed seven days of mourning for the then-upcoming destruction of the world at the time of the Flood of Noah, so too Aaron would observe seven days of mourning for the upcoming death of his sons Nadab and Abihu. The Gemara asked whether one mourns before a death, as Jacob bar Acha appears to argue happened in these two cases. In reply, the Gemara distinguished between the mourning of God and people: People, who do not know what will happen until it happens, do not mourn until the deceased dies. But God, who knows what will happen in the future, mourned for the world before its destruction. The Gemara noted, however, that there are those who say that the seven days before the Flood were days of mourning for Methuselah (who died just before the Flood).

Similarly, reading in  that "it came to pass on the eighth day," a Midrash recounted how Moses told Aaron in  "you shall not go out from the door of the tent of meeting seven days." The Midrash interpreted this to mean that Moses thereby told Aaron and his sons to observe the laws of mourning for seven days, before those laws would affect them. Moses told them in  that they were to "keep the charge of the Lord," for so God had kept seven days of mourning before God brought the Flood, as  reports, "And it came to pass after the seven days, that the waters of the Flood were upon the earth." The Midrash deduced that God was mourning by noting that  reports, "And it repented the Lord that He had made man on the earth, and it grieved Him (vayitatzeiv) at His heart." And  uses the same word to express mourning when it says, "The king grieves (ne'etzav) for his son." After God told Moses in  "And there I will meet with the children of Israel; and [the Tabernacle] shall be sanctified by My glory," Moses administered the service for seven days in fear, fearing that God would strike him down. And it was for that reason that Moses told Aaron to observe the laws of mourning. When Aaron asked Moses why, Moses replied (in the words of ) "so I am commanded." Then, as reported in  God struck Nadab and Abihu instead. And thus in  Moses told Aaron that he finally understood, "This is what the Lord meant when He said: ‘Through those near to Me I show Myself holy, and gain glory before all the people.'"

In medieval Jewish interpretation
This and the preceding parashah, Vayikra, are discussed in these medieval Jewish sources:

Leviticus chapters 1–7

Maimonides and Nachmanides differed about the reason for the sacrificial system. Maimonides wrote that the reason for the offerings was because when the Israelites lived in Egypt and Chaldea, the Egyptians worshipped sheep and the Chaldeans worshipped demons in the form of goats. And people in India never slaughter cattle. Thus God commanded the Israelites to slaughter cattle, sheep, and goats to God, so that worshipers of the other lands would know that God required the very act that they considered to be the utmost sin, and through that act God would forgive Israel's sins. God thus intended to cure the people of the other nations of false beliefs, which Maimonides characterized as diseases of the soul, for diseases are healed by medicines that are antithetical to the diseases.

Maimonides taught that God instituted the practice of sacrifices as a transitional step to wean the Israelites off of the worship of the times and move them toward prayer as the primary means of worship. Maimonides noted that in nature, God created animals that develop gradually. For example, when a mammal is born, it is extremely tender, and cannot eat dry food, so God provided breasts that yield milk to feed the young animal, until it can eat dry food. Similarly, Maimonides taught, God instituted many laws as temporary measures, as it would have been impossible for the Israelites suddenly to discontinue everything to which they had become accustomed. So God sent Moses to make the Israelites (in the words of ) "a kingdom of priests and a holy nation." But the general custom of worship in those days was sacrificing animals in temples that contained idols. So God did not command the Israelites to give up those manners of service, but allowed them to continue. God transferred to God's service what had formerly served as a worship of idols, and commanded the Israelites to serve God in the same manner — namely, to build to a Sanctuary, to erect the altar to God's name, to offer sacrifices to God, to bow down to God, and to burn incense before God. God forbad doing any of these things to any other being and selected priests for the service in the temple in  By this Divine plan, God blotted out the traces of idolatry, and established the great principle of the Existence and Unity of God. But the sacrificial service, Maimonides taught, was not the primary object of God's commandments about sacrifice; rather, supplications, prayers, and similar kinds of worship are nearer to the primary object. Thus God limited sacrifice to only one temple (see ) and the priesthood to only the members of a particular family. These restrictions, Maimonides taught, served to limit sacrificial worship, and kept it within such bounds that God did not feel it necessary to abolish sacrificial service altogether. But in the Divine plan, prayer and supplication can be offered everywhere and by every person, as can be the wearing of tzitzit and tefillin ( 16) and similar kinds of service.

Nachmanides noted that  mentioned a reason for the offerings — that they are "a fire-offering, of a pleasing odor to the Eternal." Nachmanides rejected the argument that the offerings were meant to eliminate the foreigners' foolish ideas, for the sacrifices would not have that effect, as the foreigners' intention was to worship the constellations of the sheep and the ox, and if Jews slaughtered sheep and oxen to God, it would show respect and honor to those constellations. Nachmanides further noted that when Noah came out of the ark, there were as yet no Chaldeans or Egyptians in the world, yet Noah brought an offering that pleased God so much that  reports that on its account God said, "I will not again curse the ground anymore for man's sake." Similarly, Abel brought of the first-born of his flock and  reports that "the Eternal had regard to Abel and to his offering," but there had not yet been a trace of idol worship in the world. In  Balaam said, "I have prepared the seven altars, and I have offered up a bullock and a ram on every altar," but his intent was not to eradicate evil beliefs from Balak's mind, but rather to approach God so that God's communication would reach Balaam. Nachmanides argued that the reason for the offerings was more likely that since people's deeds are accomplished through thought, speech, and action, therefore God commanded that when people sin and bring an offering, they should lay their hands on it in contrast to the evil deed that they committed. Offerers would confess their sin verbally to contrast with their evil speech. They would burn parts of the animal in fire that were seen as the instruments of thought and desire in human beings. The offerers would burn the legs of the animal because they corresponded to the limbs with which the offerer acted. The offerer sprinkled blood on the altar, which is analogous to the blood in the offerer's body. Nachmanides argued that offerers performed these acts so that the offerers should realize that the offerers had sinned against God with their bodies. And the offerer's soul and blood should have been spilled and the offerer's body burned, were it not for God's loving-kindness in taking a substitute and a ransom — the offering — so that the offering's blood should be in place of the offerer's blood, its life in place of the offerer's life, and that the limbs of the offering in place of the parts of the offerer's body.

Leviticus chapter 8
The Zohar observed that Aaron had to purge himself, for but for him the Golden Calf would not have emerged.

In modern interpretation
The parashah is discussed in these modern sources:

Leviticus chapters 6–7

Professor James Kugel of Bar Ilan University reported that ancient texts offered several explanations for why peoples of the ancient Near East sacrificed animals: to provide the deity food (see ); to offer the life of the slaughtered animal as a substitute for the offerer's; to give a costly possession as a sign of fealty or in the hope of receiving still more generous compensation from the deity. Kugel reported that more recent explanations saw the sacrifice as establishing a tangible connection between the sacrificer and the deity, while others stress the connection of the sacred with violence or see the function of religion as defusing violence that would otherwise be directed at people. Kugel argued that the Israelites conceived of animal sacrifices as the principal channel of communication between the people and God. Professor William Hallo, formerly of Yale University, described sacrifice as a sacred-making of the human consumption of animal meat that followed.

Professor Jacob Milgrom, formerly of the University of California, Berkeley, read the sacrificial system in the parashah to describe the forces of life and death pitted against each other in a cosmic struggle, set loose by people through their obedience to or defiance of God's commandments. Milgrom taught that Leviticus treats impurity as the opposite of holiness, identifying impurity with death and holiness with life. Milgrom interpreted Leviticus to teach that people could drive God out of the sanctuary by polluting it with their moral and ritual sins. But the priests could periodically purge the sanctuary of its impurities and influence the people to atone. The blood of the purification offerings symbolically purged the sanctuary by symbolically absorbing its impurities, in a victory for life over death.

Similarly, Gordon Wenham of Trinity College, Bristol, noted that the sacrificial system regularly associates sacrifices with cleansing and sanctification. Wenham read Leviticus to teach that sacrificial blood was necessary to cleanse and sanctify. Sacrifice could undo the effects of sin and human infirmity. Sin and disease profaned the holy and polluted the clean, whereas sacrifice could reverse this process. Wenham illustrated with the chart at right. Wenham concluded that contact between the holy and the unclean resulted in death. Sacrifice, by cleansing the unclean, made such contact possible. Sacrifice thus allowed the holy God to meet with sinful man.

The 20th century British anthropologist Mary Douglas wrote that to find the underlying logic of the first chapters of Leviticus about how to make a sacrifice and how to lay out the animal sections on the altar, one needs to look carefully at what Leviticus says about bodies and parts of bodies, what is inner and outer, and what is on top and underneath. Douglas suggested this alignment of the three levels of Mount Sinai, the animal sacrifice, and the Tabernacle:

Douglas argued that the tabernacle ran horizontally toward the most sacred area, Mount Sinai went up vertically to the summit, and the sacrificial pile started with the head underneath and went up to the entrails, and one can interpret each by reference to the others. Douglas noted that in mystical thought, “upper” and “inner” can be equivalent. The pattern is always there throughout creation, with God in the depths or on the heights of everything. Likening the tabernacle to a body, the innards corresponded to the Holy of Holies, for the Bible locates the emotions and thought in the innermost parts of the body; the loins are wrung with remorse or grief; God scrutinizes the innermost part; compassion resides in the bowels. The Tabernacle was associated with creation, and creation with fertility, implying that the innermost part of the Tabernacle was a Divine nuptial chamber, depicting the union between God and Israel. Douglas concluded that the summit of the mountain was the abode of God, below was the cloudy region that only Moses could enter, and the lower slopes were where the priests and congregation waited, and analogously, the order of placing the parts of the animal on the altar marked out three zones on the carcass, the suet set around and below the diaphragm corresponding to the cloud girdling the middle of the mountain.

The 20th century Reform Rabbi Bernard Bamberger noted that while the Rabbis introduced into the synagogue a number of practices formerly associated with the Temple, they made no provision for "interim” sacrifices, even though they could have found precedents for sacrifice outside Jerusalem. When the Roman Empire destroyed the Jerusalem Temple, the Rabbis did not choose to follow those precedents for sacrifice elsewhere, but instead set up a substitute, declaring the study of the sacrificial laws as acceptable to God as sacrifices. Bamberger suggested that some scholars may have felt that the day of sacrifice had passed.

Leviticus chapter 8
Reading  Milgrom noted that abundant attestation exists of ritual daubing in the ancient Near East. The incantations recited during the ritual smearing of persons, gods' statues, and buildings testify to a purificatory and apotropaic purpose — to wipe off and ward off menacing demonic forces. These ancient Near East applications always smear the vulnerable parts of bodies (extremities) and structures (corners, entrances) with magical substances. Milgrom concluded that the blood daubing of the altar's extremities — its horns — closely resembles the blood daubing of the extremities of the priests in  Milgrom also noted the correspondence of the dedicatory rite of Ezekiel's altar to the daubing of the priests, for in  the purificatory blood is daubed not only on the altar's horns but also on the corners of its two gutters, located at its middle and bottom. Milgrom argued that these points correspond to a person's earlobe, thumb, and big toe. Milgrom concluded that these two rites shared the same purpose, which in the case of Ezekiel's altar  made explicit: "And you shall decontaminate it and thus purge it." Similarly,  says that through it "they shall purge the altar and thus purify it." Therefore, Milgrom concluded that the daubing of the priest at points of his body and the daubing of comparable points on the altar possessed a similar goal of purging.

In critical analysis
Scholars who follow the Documentary Hypothesis attribute the parashah to the Priestly source who wrote in the 6th or 5th century BCE.

Commandments
According to the Sefer ha-Chinuch, there are 9 positive and 9 negative commandments in the parashah:
To remove the ashes from the altar every day
To light a fire on the altar every day
Not to extinguish this fire
The priests must eat the remains of the meal offerings.
Not to bake a meal offering as leavened bread
The High Priest must bring a meal offering every day.
Not to eat the meal offering of the High Priest
To carry out the procedure of the sin offering
Not to eat the meat of the inner sin offering
To carry out the procedure of the guilt offering
To follow the procedure of the peace offering
Not to allow any of the thanksgiving offering to remain until the morning
To burn the leftover korbanot
Not to eat from korbanot offered with improper intentions
Not to eat from korbanot that became impure
To burn all impure korbanot
Not to eat fat that can be used for korbanot, (chelev)
Not to eat blood

In the liturgy
Many Jews read excerpts from and allusions to the instructions in the parashah as part of the readings on the offerings after the Sabbath morning blessings.

The rule provides that an item included in a generalization that is then singled out to teach something is singled out not to teach only about that particular item but about the generalization in its entirety.  prohibits the eating of sacrificial meat by anyone ritually contaminated, and  then singles out the peace offering and states that a contaminated person who eats the peace offering is subject to excision (kareit). Applying the eighth rule teaches that the punishment of excision applies to a contaminated person who eats any of the offerings.

Haftarah

Generally

Connection to the Parashah
Both the parashah and the haftarah refer to the burnt offering (olah) and sacrifice (zevach). In the haftarah, Jeremiah spoke of the priority of obedience to God's law over ritual sacrifice alone.

On Shabbat HaGadol
When the parashah coincides with Shabbat HaGadol (the special Sabbath immediately before Passover — as it does in 2018, 2020, 2021, 2023, 2025, 2026, 2028, and 2029), the haftarah is  Shabbat HaGadol means "the Great Sabbath," and the haftarah for the special Sabbath refers to a great day that God is preparing.

On Shabbat Parah
When the parashah coincides with Shabbat Parah (the special Sabbath preceding Shabbat HaChodesh — as it does in 2024, 2027, and 2030), the haftarah is

On Shabbat Zachor
When the parashah coincides with Shabbat Zachor (the special Sabbath immediately preceding Purim — as it did in 2014), the haftarah is:
for Ashkenazi Jews: 
for Sephardi Jews:

Connection to the Special Sabbath
On Shabbat Zachor, the Sabbath just before Purim, Jews read  which instructs Jews: "Remember (zachor) what Amalek did" in attacking the Israelites. The haftarah for Shabbat Zachor,  or 1–34, describes Saul's encounter with Amalek and Saul's and Samuel's treatment of the Amalekite king Agag. Purim, in turn, commemorates the story of Esther and the Jewish people's victory over Haman's plan to kill the Jews, told in the Book of Esther.  identifies Haman as an Agagite, and thus a descendant of Amalek.  identifies the Agagites with the Amalekites. Alternatively, a Midrash tells the story that between King Agag's capture by Saul and his killing by Samuel, Agag fathered a child, from whom Haman in turn descended.

Notes

Further reading
The parashah has parallels or is discussed in these sources:

Biblical
 (right ear, thumb of right hand, and great toe of right foot).
 (preferring obedience to sacrifices).
 (the offering of our lips instead of bulls).
 (burnt offerings);  (washing before the altar);  (sacrifices);  (sacrifices of thanksgiving);  (sacrifices);  (burnt offerings);  (God's holy place);  (sacrifices of thanksgiving);  (sacrifices of thanksgiving);  (anointing Aaron).

Early nonrabbinic
Philo. Allegorical Interpretation 3:45:129, 46:133, 50:147; On the Migration of Abraham 12:67; Who Is the Heir of Divine Things? 36:174; On the Life of Moses 2:29:150; The Special Laws 1:41:225, 43:240, 46:254, 52:285. Alexandria, Egypt, early 1st Century C.E. In, e.g., The Works of Philo: Complete and Unabridged, New Updated Edition. Translated by Charles Duke Yonge, pages 65, 67, 259, 290, 504, 555, 557–58, 561. Peabody, Massachusetts: Hendrickson Publishers, 1993. .
Josephus, Antiquities of the Jews 3:9:1–4, 11:2; 4:8:9, 11:1; 8:8:4. Circa 93–94. In, e.g., The Works of Josephus: Complete and Unabridged, New Updated Edition. Translated by William Whiston, pages 94–95. Peabody, Massachusetts: Hendrickson Publishers, 1987. .

Classical rabbinic
Mishnah: Challah 1:6; Orlah 2:16–17; Bikkurim 2:7–10; Shekalim 1:4, 7:6; Yoma 7:5; Megillah 2:6; Sotah 9:12; Zevachim 1:1–14:10; Menachot 1:1–13:11; Chullin 7:1, 10:1; Keritot 1:1; Tamid 1:2, 4; 2:3; Kinnim 1:1. Land of Israel, circa 200 C.E. In, e.g., The Mishnah: A New Translation. Translated by Jacob Neusner, pages 149, 164, 171, 252, 263, 277, 320, 464, 699–765, 779, 784, 836, 863–65. New Haven: Yale University Press, 1988. .
Tosefta: Demai 2:7–8; Challah 2:7–8; Pisha (Pesachim) 8:9; Megillah 3:21; Sotah 13:7; Bava Kamma 10:13; Shevuot 2:10; 3:1, 6; Zevachim 1:1–13:20; Menachot 1:1–13:23; Oktzin 3:3. Land of Israel, circa 250 C.E. In, e.g., The Tosefta: Translated from the Hebrew, with a New Introduction. Translated by Jacob Neusner, volume 1, pages 85–86, 339, 511, 650, 886; volume 2, pages 1012, 1227, 1229, 1231, 1307–70, 1407–68, 1925. Peabody, Massachusetts: Hendrickson Publishers, 2002. .
Sifra 70:1–98:9. Land of Israel, 4th Century C.E. In, e.g., Sifra: An Analytical Translation. Translated by Jacob Neusner, volume 2, pages 1–119. Atlanta: Scholars Press, 1988. .
Jerusalem Talmud: Orlah 33b, 34b; Bikkurim 12b, 25a; Shabbat 18b; Pesachim 13a–14a, 36b–37a, 44a, 56b–57a, 63b, 64b, 78a; Yoma 1a, 2a, 3a–b, 6a, 11a–b, 12a, 21b, 30b–31a, 32a, 39a, 49b; Sukkah 14a; Megillah 16a–b, 18b, 26a; Moed Katan 17a; Chagigah 23a; Yevamot 1a, 48b, 49b; Nazir 26b; Sotah 14b, 18b–19a, 24b, 26a, 39a, 42b. Tiberias, Land of Israel, circa 400 C.E. In, e.g., Talmud Yerushalmi. Edited by Chaim Malinowitz, Yisroel Simcha Schorr, and Mordechai Marcus, volumes 12–13, 18–19, 21–22, 26–30, 35–37. Brooklyn: Mesorah Publications, 2007–2017. And in, e.g., The Jerusalem Talmud: A Translation and Commentary. Edited by Jacob Neusner and translated by Jacob Neusner, Tzvee Zahavy, B. Barry Levy, and Edward Goldman. Peabody, Massachusetts: Hendrickson Publishers, 2009. .
Leviticus Rabbah 7:1–10:9. Land of Israel, 5th Century. In, e.g., Midrash Rabbah: Leviticus. Translated by Harry Freedman and Maurice Simon, volume 4, pages 89–134. London: Soncino Press, 1939. .

Babylonian Talmud: Shabbat 111a, 114a, 132a; Pesachim 3a, 16a–b, 19a, 23a–24b, 26a, 27b, 35a, 37a, 38b, 43b, 45a, 58a–59b, 63b, 65b, 71b, 79a, 82a–83a, 95b–96a; Yoma 2a–b, 4a, 5a–b, 7a, 12b, 20a, 21a, 23b–24a, 25a, 28a, 33a–34a, 45a–b, 46b–47a, 59b–60a, 74a–b; Sukkah 43a, 47b, 55b–56a; Beitzah 19b, 21a; Rosh Hashanah 5b–6a; Taanit 11b; Megillah 9b, 20b, 23b; Moed Katan 9a, 15b; Chagigah 7b, 10b, 24a, 26b; Yevamot 7a, 39b–40a, 68b, 72b, 74b, 81a, 82a, 87a, 100a; Ketubot 5b, 25a, 106b; Nedarim 10b, 12a–b, 25a, 36a; Nazir 37b–38a; Sotah 14b–15a, 19a, 23a–b, 29a–b; Kiddushin 29a, 30a, 36b, 51a, 53a, 55b; Bava Kamma 5a, 13a, 41a, 82b, 110b, 111a; Bava Metzia 3b, 55a; Bava Batra 106b; Sanhedrin 34a, 42b, 61b; Makkot 13a, 14b, 17a–b, 18b; Shevuot 6b–7a, 11a, 15a–b, 29a, 38a; Avodah Zarah 34a–b, 76a; Horayot 3a, 9a, 11b–12a; Zevachim 2a–120b; Menachot 2a–110a; Chullin 22a, 23b, 36b–37a, 39a, 45a, 74b–75a, 81b, 99a, 101a, 117a–b, 120a, 130a, 131b, 132b–33b, 134b; Bekhorot 15a, 30b, 33b, 39a; Arakhin 3b–4a; Temurah 14a, 18a–b, 23a, 32b; Keritot 2a, 4a–b, 5a–6a, 20b–21b, 22b, 23b, 27a; Meilah 2a, 5a–6b, 9a, 10a, 11b–12a; Tamid 28a–29a, 30a; Niddah 6b, 40a–41a. Babylonia, 6th Century. In, e.g., Talmud Bavli. Edited by Yisroel Simcha Schorr, Chaim Malinowitz, and Mordechai Marcus, 72 volumes. Brooklyn: Mesorah Pubs., 2006.

Medieval
Rashi. Commentary. Leviticus 6–8. Troyes, France, late 11th Century. In, e.g., Rashi. The Torah: With Rashi's Commentary Translated, Annotated, and Elucidated. Translated and annotated by Yisrael Isser Zvi Herczeg, volume 3, pages 59–92. Brooklyn: Mesorah Publications, 1994. .
Rashbam. Commentary on the Torah. Troyes, early 12th century. In, e.g., Rashbam's Commentary on Leviticus and Numbers: An Annotated Translation. Edited and translated by Martin I. Lockshin, pages 35–46. Providence: Brown Judaic Studies, 2001. .
Judah Halevi. Kuzari. 2:80. Toledo, Spain, 1130–1140. In, e.g., Jehuda Halevi. Kuzari: An Argument for the Faith of Israel. Introduction by Henry Slonimsky, page 133. New York: Schocken, 1964. .
Abraham ibn Ezra. Commentary on the Torah. Mid-12th century. In, e.g., Ibn Ezra's Commentary on the Pentateuch: Leviticus (Va-yikra). Translated and annotated by H. Norman Strickman and Arthur M. Silver, volume 3, pages 29–55. New York: Menorah Publishing Company, 2004. .
Hezekiah ben Manoah. Hizkuni. France, circa 1240. In, e.g., Chizkiyahu ben Manoach. Chizkuni: Torah Commentary. Translated and annotated by Eliyahu Munk, volume 3, pages 679–93. Jerusalem: Ktav Publishers, 2013. .
Nachmanides. Commentary on the Torah. Jerusalem, circa 1270. In, e.g., Ramban (Nachmanides): Commentary on the Torah. Translated by Charles B. Chavel, volume 3, pages 59–101. New York: Shilo Publishing House, 1974. .
Zohar 2:236b, 238b; 3:27a–35b, 37a, 87a, 107b, 213a. Spain, late 13th Century. In, e.g., The Zohar. Translated by Harry Sperling and Maurice Simon. 5 volumes. London: Soncino Press, 1934.
Bahya ben Asher. Commentary on the Torah. Spain, early 14th century. In, e.g., Midrash Rabbeinu Bachya: Torah Commentary by Rabbi Bachya ben Asher. Translated and annotated by Eliyahu Munk, volume 5, pages 1528–72. Jerusalem: Lambda Publishers, 2003. .
Jacob ben Asher (Baal Ha-Turim). Rimze Ba'al ha-Turim. Early 14th century. In, e.g., Baal Haturim Chumash: Vayikra/Leviticus. Translated by Eliyahu Touger, edited, elucidated, and annotated by Avie Gold, volume 3, pages 1055–77. Brooklyn: Mesorah Publications, 2000. .
Jacob ben Asher. Perush Al ha-Torah. Early 14th century. In, e.g., Yaakov ben Asher. Tur on the Torah. Translated and annotated by Eliyahu Munk, volume 3, pages 806–26. Jerusalem: Lambda Publishers, 2005. .
Isaac ben Moses Arama. Akedat Yizhak (The Binding of Isaac). Late 15th century. In, e.g., Yitzchak Arama. Akeydat Yitzchak: Commentary of Rabbi Yitzchak Arama on the Torah. Translated and condensed by Eliyahu Munk, volume 2, pages 558–67. New York, Lambda Publishers, 2001. .

Modern
Isaac Abravanel. Commentary on the Torah. Italy, between 1492 and 1509. In, e.g., Abarbanel: Selected Commentaries on the Torah: Volume 3: Vayikra/Leviticus. Translated and annotated by Israel Lazar, pages 59–80. Brooklyn: CreateSpace, 2015. . Excerpted in, e.g., Abarbanel on the Torah: Selected Themes. Translated by Avner Tomaschoff, pages 360–81. Jerusalem: Jewish Agency for Israel, 2007. .
Obadiah ben Jacob Sforno. Commentary on the Torah. Venice, 1567. In, e.g., Sforno: Commentary on the Torah. Translation and explanatory notes by Raphael Pelcovitz, pages 514–25. Brooklyn: Mesorah Publications, 1997. .
Moshe Alshich. Commentary on the Torah. Safed, circa 1593. In, e.g., Moshe Alshich. Midrash of Rabbi Moshe Alshich on the Torah. Translated and annotated by Eliyahu Munk, volume 2, pages 634–43. New York, Lambda Publishers, 2000. .

Avraham Yehoshua Heschel. Commentaries on the Torah. Cracow, Poland, mid 17th century. Compiled as Chanukat HaTorah. Edited by Chanoch Henoch Erzohn. Piotrkow, Poland, 1900. In Avraham Yehoshua Heschel. Chanukas HaTorah: Mystical Insights of Rav Avraham Yehoshua Heschel on Chumash. Translated by Avraham Peretz Friedman, pages 207–10. Southfield, Michigan: Targum Press/Feldheim Publishers, 2004. .
Thomas Hobbes. Leviathan, part 3, chapters 40, 42. England, 1651. Reprint edited by C. B. Macpherson, pages 503–04, 572. Harmondsworth, England: Penguin Classics, 1982. .
Shabbethai Bass. Sifsei Chachamim. Amsterdam, 1680. In, e.g., Sefer Vayikro: From the Five Books of the Torah: Chumash: Targum Okelos: Rashi: Sifsei Chachamim: Yalkut: Haftaros, translated by Avrohom Y. Davis, pages 85–139. Lakewood Township, New Jersey: Metsudah Publications, 2012.
Chaim ibn Attar. Ohr ha-Chaim. Venice, 1742. In Chayim ben Attar. Or Hachayim: Commentary on the Torah. Translated by Eliyahu Munk, volume 3, pages 986–1019. Brooklyn: Lambda Publishers, 1999. .
Yitzchak Magriso. Me'am Lo'ez. Constantinople, 1753. In Yitzchak Magriso. The Torah Anthology: MeAm Lo'ez. Translated by Aryeh Kaplan, volume 11, pages 119–86. New York: Moznaim Publishing, 1989. .
Nachman of Breslov. Teachings. Bratslav, Ukraine, before 1811. In Rebbe Nachman's Torah: Breslov Insights into the Weekly Torah Reading: Exodus-Leviticus. Compiled by Chaim Kramer, edited by Y. Hall, pages 314–20. Jerusalem: Breslov Research Institute, 2011. .

Samuel David Luzzatto (Shadal). Commentary on the Torah. Padua, 1871. In, e.g., Samuel David Luzzatto. Torah Commentary. Translated and annotated by Eliyahu Munk, volume 3, pages 916–23. New York: Lambda Publishers, 2012. .
Yehudah Aryeh Leib Alter. Sefat Emet. Góra Kalwaria (Ger), Poland, before 1906. Excerpted in The Language of Truth: The Torah Commentary of Sefat Emet. Translated and interpreted by Arthur Green, pages 153–58. Philadelphia: Jewish Publication Society, 1998. . Reprinted 2012. .
Louis Ginzberg. Legends of the Jews, volume 3 , pages 179–81. Philadelphia: Jewish Publication Society, 1911.
George Buchanan Gray. Sacrifice in the Old Testament: Its Theory and Practice. Oxford: Oxford University Press, 1925. Reprinted by Ktav Publishing House, 1971.
Alexander Alan Steinbach. Sabbath Queen: Fifty-four Bible Talks to the Young Based on Each Portion of the Pentateuch, pages 78–81. New York: Behrman's Jewish Book House, 1936.
Isaac Mendelsohn. "Urim and Thummim." In The Interpreter's Dictionary of the Bible, volume 4, pages 739–40. Nashville, Tennessee: Abingdon Press, 1962. .
Roland De Vaux. Studies in Old Testament Sacrifice. University of Wales Press, 1964. .

Moshe Greenberg. "Urim and Thummim." In Encyclopaedia Judaica, volume 16, pages 8–9. Jerusalem: Keter Publishing House, 1972. .
Carol L. Meyers. The Tabernacle Menorah. Missoula, Montana: Scholars Press, 1976. .
Jacob Milgrom. "Sacrifices and Offerings, OT," and "Wave offering." In The Interpreter's Dictionary of the Bible. Supp. volume, pages 763–71, 944–46. Nashville, Tenn.: Abingdon, 1976. .
Gordon J. Wenham. The Book of Leviticus, pages 112–45. Grand Rapids, Michigan: William B. Eerdmans Publishing Company, 1979. .
Pinchas H. Peli. Torah Today: A Renewed Encounter with Scripture, pages 111–14. Washington, D.C.: B'nai B'rith Books, 1987. .
David P. Wright. "The Disposal of Impurity: Elimination Rites in the Bible and in Hittite and Mesopotamian Literature." Society of Biblical Literature Dissertation Studies. Volume 101 (1987): pages 34–36.
Mark S. Smith. The Early History of God: Yahweh and the Other Deities in Ancient Israel, page 2. New York: HarperSanFrancisco, 1990. ..
Harvey J. Fields. A Torah Commentary for Our Times: Volume II: Exodus and Leviticus, pages 104–10. New York: UAHC Press, 1991. .
Victor Avigdor Hurowitz. “Review Essay: Ancient Israelite Cult in History, Tradition, and Interpretation.” AJS Review, volume 19 (number 2) (1994): pages 213–36.
Walter C. Kaiser Jr., "The Book of Leviticus," in The New Interpreter's Bible, volume 1, pages 1042–63. Nashville: Abingdon Press, 1994. .
Judith S. Antonelli. "The Priesthood." In In the Image of God: A Feminist Commentary on the Torah, pages 247–56. Northvale, New Jersey: Jason Aronson, 1995. .

Ellen Frankel. The Five Books of Miriam: A Woman’s Commentary on the Torah, pages 156–58. New York: G. P. Putnam's Sons, 1996. .
W. Gunther Plaut. The Haftarah Commentary, pages 244–53. New York: UAHC Press, 1996. .
Sorel Goldberg Loeb and Barbara Binder Kadden. Teaching Torah: A Treasury of Insights and Activities, pages 172–76. Denver: A.R.E. Publishing, 1997. .
Cornelis Van Dam. The Urim and Thummin: A Means of Revelation in Ancient Israel. Winona Lake, Indiana: Eisenbrauns, 1997. .
Jacob Milgrom. Leviticus 1–16, volume 3, pages 378–569. New York: Anchor Bible, 1998. .
Mary Douglas. Leviticus as Literature, pages 20, 71, 76–77, 83–84, 113, 120, 123, 125–26, 128, 134, 150, 166, 187, 199, 203, 224, 231, 239, 244, 249–51. Oxford: Oxford University Press, 1999. .
Susan Freeman. Teaching Jewish Virtues: Sacred Sources and Arts Activities, pages 165–78. Springfield, New Jersey: A.R.E. Publishing, 1999. ..
Frank H. Gorman Jr. “Leviticus.” In The HarperCollins Bible Commentary. Edited by James L. Mays, pages 150–54. New York: HarperCollins Publishers, revised edition, 2000. .
Claire Magidovitch Green. "Message and Messenger." In The Women's Torah Commentary: New Insights from Women Rabbis on the 54 Weekly Torah Portions. Edited by Elyse Goldstein, pages 191–95. Woodstock, Vermont: Jewish Lights Publishing, 2000. .
Lainie Blum Cogan and Judy Weiss. Teaching Haftarah: Background, Insights, and Strategies, pages 382–91. Denver: A.R.E. Publishing, 2002. .
Michael Fishbane. The JPS Bible Commentary: Haftarot, pages 155–61. Philadelphia: Jewish Publication Society, 2002. .
Robert Alter. The Five Books of Moses: A Translation with Commentary, pages 564–75. New York: W.W. Norton & Co., 2004. .
Elaine Rose Glickman. "Haftarat Tzav: Jeremiah 7:21–8:3; 9:22–23." In The Women's Haftarah Commentary: New Insights from Women Rabbis on the 54 Weekly Haftarah Portions, the 5 Megillot & Special Shabbatot. Edited by Elyse Goldstein, pages 116–20. Woodstock, Vermont: Jewish Lights Publishing, 2004. .
Jacob Milgrom. Leviticus: A Book of Ritual and Ethics: A Continental Commentary, pages 62–87. Minneapolis: Fortress Press, 2004. .
Baruch J. Schwartz. "Leviticus." In The Jewish Study Bible. Edited by Adele Berlin and Marc Zvi Brettler, pages 217–24. New York: Oxford University Press, 2004. .
Antony Cothey. “Ethics and Holiness in the Theology of Leviticus.” Journal for the Study of the Old Testament, volume 30 (number 2) (December 2005): pages 131–51.
Professors on the Parashah: Studies on the Weekly Torah Reading Edited by Leib Moscovitz, pages 166–67. Jerusalem: Urim Publications, 2005. .
Bernard J. Bamberger. “Leviticus.” In The Torah: A Modern Commentary: Revised Edition. Edited by W. Gunther Plaut; revised edition edited by David E.S. Stern, pages 686–703. New York: Union for Reform Judaism, 2006. .
Suzanne A. Brody. "A Woman's Portion." In Dancing in the White Spaces: The Yearly Torah Cycle and More Poems, page 86. Shelbyville, Kentucky: Wasteland Press, 2007. .
James L. Kugel. How To Read the Bible: A Guide to Scripture, Then and Now, pages 301–03, 358. New York: Free Press, 2007. .
Christophe Nihan. From Priestly Torah to Pentateuch: A Study in the Composition of the Book of Leviticus. Coronet Books, 2007. .
James W. Watts. Ritual and Rhetoric in Leviticus: From Sacrifice to Scripture. New York: Cambridge University Press, 2007. .
The Torah: A Women's Commentary. Edited by Tamara Cohn Eskenazi and Andrea L. Weiss, pages 593–614. New York: URJ Press, 2008. .
Noach Dzmura. “HaNer Tamid, dos Pintele Yid v’ha Zohar Muzar: The Eternal Flame, the Jewish Spark, and the Flaming Queer: Parashat Tsav (Leviticus 6:1–8:36).” In Torah Queeries: Weekly Commentaries on the Hebrew Bible. Edited by Gregg Drinkwater, Joshua Lesser, and David Shneer; foreword by Judith Plaskow, pages 129–34. New York: New York University Press, 2009. .
Reuven Hammer. Entering Torah: Prefaces to the Weekly Torah Portion, pages 147–52. New York: Gefen Publishing House, 2009. .
Roy E. Gane. "Leviticus." In Zondervan Illustrated Bible Backgrounds Commentary. Edited by John H. Walton, volume 1, pages 296–98. Grand Rapids, Michigan: Zondervan, 2009. .
Mark Leuchter. “The Politics of Ritual Rhetoric: A Proposed Sociopolitical Context for the Redaction of Leviticus 1–16.” Vetus Testamentum, volume 60 (number 3) (2010): pages 345–65.
Jeffrey Stackert. “Leviticus.” In The New Oxford Annotated Bible: New Revised Standard Version with the Apocrypha: An Ecumenical Study Bible. Edited by Michael D. Coogan, Marc Z. Brettler, Carol A. Newsom, and Pheme Perkins, pages 150–54. New York: Oxford University Press, Revised 4th Edition 2010. .

William G. Dever. The Lives of Ordinary People in Ancient Israel: When Archaeology and the Bible Intersect, page 244. Grand Rapids, Michigan: William B. Eerdmans Publishing Company, 2012. .
Shmuel Herzfeld. "A Response to Catastrophe." In Fifty-Four Pick Up: Fifteen-Minute Inspirational Torah Lessons, pages 147–50. Jerusalem: Gefen Publishing House, 2012. .
David Greenstein. "Urged To Remember: We must remember the heinous crimes of Amalek so that we may avoid the danger of repeating those crimes ourselves." The Jerusalem Report, volume 24 (number 25) (March 24, 2014): page 47.
Annette Yoshiko Reed. "From Sacrifice to the Slaughterhouse: Ancient and Modern Approaches to Meat, Animals, and Civilization." (2015).

Jonathan Sacks. Covenant & Conversation: A Weekly Reading of the Jewish Bible: Leviticus: The Book of Holiness, pages 99–131. Jerusalem: Maggid Books, 2015. .
Jonathan Sacks. Lessons in Leadership: A Weekly Reading of the Jewish Bible, pages 129–33. New Milford, Connecticut: Maggid Books, 2015. .
Jonathan Sacks. Essays on Ethics: A Weekly Reading of the Jewish Bible, pages 159–64. New Milford, Connecticut: Maggid Books, 2016. .
Shai Held. The Heart of Torah, Volume 2: Essays on the Weekly Torah Portion: Leviticus, Numbers, and Deuteronomy, pages 15–25. Philadelphia: Jewish Publication Society, 2017. .
Steven Levy and Sarah Levy. The JPS Rashi Discussion Torah Commentary, pages 80–82. Philadelphia: Jewish Publication Society, 2017. .

External links

Texts
Masoretic text and 1917 JPS translation
Hear the parashah chanted 
Hear the parashah read in Hebrew

Commentaries

Academy for Jewish Religion, California
Academy for Jewish Religion, New York
Aish.com 
Akhlah: The Jewish Children's Learning Network 
Aleph Beta Academy
American Jewish University — Ziegler School of Rabbinic Studies
Anshe Emes Synagogue, Los Angeles 
Ari Goldwag
Ascent of Safed
Bar-Ilan University 
Chabad.org
eparsha.com
G-dcast
The Israel Koschitzky Virtual Beit Midrash
Jewish Agency for Israel
Jewish Theological Seminary
Mechon Hadar
Miriam Aflalo 
MyJewishLearning.com
Ohr Sameach
ON Scripture — The Torah
Orthodox Union
OzTorah, Torah from Australia
Oz Ve Shalom — Netivot Shalom
Pardes from Jerusalem
Professor James L. Kugel
Professor Michael Carasik 
Rabbi Dov Linzer
Rabbi Fabian Werbin
Rabbi Jonathan Sacks
RabbiShimon.com 
Rabbi Shlomo Riskin
Rabbi Shmuel Herzfeld
Rabbi Stan Levin 
Reconstructionist Judaism 
Sephardic Institute 
Shiur.com
613.org Jewish Torah Audio
Suzanne A. Brody
Talia Davis
Tanach Study Center
Teach613.org, Torah Education at Cherry Hill
TheTorah.com
Torah from Dixie 
Torah.org
TorahVort.com
Union for Reform Judaism
United Synagogue of Conservative Judaism 
What's Bothering Rashi?
Yeshivat Chovevei Torah
Yeshiva University

Weekly Torah readings in Adar
Weekly Torah readings in Nisan
Weekly Torah readings from Leviticus